Michael Andrew Lewis (born 9 November 1977) is a British philosopher. He is the co-founder and general editor of the Journal of Italian Philosophy.
Lewis is known for his expertise on continental philosophy.

Books
 The Beautiful Animal: Sincerity, Charm, and the Fossilised Dialectic, Rowman and Littlefield, 2018
 Phenomenology: An Introduction, with Tanja Staehler, Continuum, 2010
 Derrida and Lacan: Another Writing, Edinburgh University Press, 2008
 Heidegger Beyond Deconstruction: On Nature, Bloomsbury, 2007
 Heidegger and the Place of Ethics: Being-with in the Crossing of Heidegger's Thought, Bloomsbury, 2005

References

External links
Michael Lewis at Newcastle University

21st-century British philosophers
Phenomenologists
Continental philosophers
Kant scholars
Philosophy academics
Heidegger scholars
Academics of Newcastle University
Living people
Philosophy journal editors
1977 births
Derrida scholars
Academics of the University of Sussex
Academics of the University of the West of England, Bristol
Academics of the University of Warwick
Alumni of the University of Warwick
Alumni of the University of Essex